Thoniyan Puthiyapurayil Shihabuddin, better known as Shihabuddin Poythumkadavu or Shihabuddin Poithumkadavu ,(born 29 October 1963) is an Indian writer, journalist, poet, orator and television personality.

Life 

Shihabuddin Poythumkadavu was born on 29 October 1963 at Poythumkadavu near Valapattanam in Kannur district, Kerala. He is married to Najma, now working in a Government Higher Secondary School near Pattambi as an English teacher, and the couple has 4 children. He has resided in Kunnamkulam, Thrissur district since 2000.

Short story collections
 Aarkkum Vendatha Oru Kannu
 Ee Stationil Ottakku-the first fantasy short story collection in Malayalam language
 Thala
 Kathunna Thalayana
 Randu Eleppamar
 Manjukaalam
 Malabar Express
 Shihabuddinte Kathakal
 Thiranjedutha Kathakal- Selected Short Stories 
 Katilekku Pookalle Kunje  
 Oru Paattinte Dooram 
 Eesayum KP Ummarum

Novels
 Eercha
 Aalivaidyan
 Shihabudheen Poithumkadavinte Novellakal
 Nalla Ayalkkaran
Thurumbu Mullaniyude Hridayam

Poems
 Nootandukalayi Kathuvachathu
 Kadalmarubhumiyile Veedu
 Ajnjathayude kannukal (English, French, Malayalam trilingual edition) 
   Shihabudheente KavithakalEssays / Memoirs
 Kathapathram Veettumuttathu jeevaparyantham  MarujeevithamBook on the author 
  Kadhayude Jalashyam -Written by TM Ramachandran

 Translated Works
 Yarrikkum Vendatha Kan -Translated by KV Shylaja
  Do not go to the jungle - Translated by  Dr.J. Devika

Screen Play
 Kasavu TV Serial directed by P. N. Menon (director)
  Bhumiyude Uppu Co- writer with Sunny Joseph

As director
  Khabar Tele Film
 Aalmarattam Tele Film

Awards

 1996: V. T. Bhattathiripad Award – Manjukaalam 2007: Kerala Sahitya Akademi Award – Thiranjedutha Kathakal 2007: Padmarajan Award – Taj Mahalile Ravukal State Bank of Travancore Award – Kathunna Thalayana''
 Ankanam Award
 Abu Dhabi Sakthi Award
 Kala Award
 Abu Dhabi Malayali Samajam Award
 Ayanam Award

References

 മലബാറിലെ കഥയെക്‌സ്പ്രസ് ഇപ്പോൾ ബുള്ളറ്റ് ട്രെയിനാണ്...
'ഈസ': പുനര്‍ജന്മത്തിലെ പ്രവാസ പ്രവാചകന്‍..
 കണ്ണൂരിലെ കൊലപാതക രാഷ്ട്രീയത്തെപ്പറ്റി ഇനി എഴുതുന്നില്ല -ശിഹാബുദ്ദീൻ പൊയ്ത്തുംകടവ് 
 അയനം-സി.വി ശ്രീരാമന്‍ കഥാപുരസ്‌കാരം ശിഹാബുദ്ദീന്‍ പൊയ്ത്തുംകടവിന്..
 കെ.പി ഉമ്മര്‍ - ശിഹാബുദ്ദീന്‍ പൊയ്ത്തുംകടവിന്റെ കഥ..
 ‘Do Not Go to the Jungle’ is a collection of ‘socio-horror’ short stories, both macabre and tender

External links 
 Books by Shihabuddin Poythumkadavu

1963 births
Living people
Malayalam-language journalists
Indian male novelists
Malayalam-language writers
Malayalam poets
Malayalam short story writers
Writers from Kannur
Journalists from Kerala
Recipients of the Kerala Sahitya Akademi Award
Indian male poets
Malayalam novelists
20th-century Indian novelists
20th-century Indian poets
20th-century Indian short story writers
Indian male short story writers
Novelists from Kerala
Poets from Kerala
Indian lecturers
20th-century Indian male writers